Phoenix Art Institute, originally located at 350 Madison Avenue in New York, New York, was an educational institution co-founded in 1925 by Franklin Booth with Lauros M. Phoenix. In 1944, it merged with the New York School of Applied Design for Women, becoming the New York Phoenix School of Design. In 1974, the New York Phoenix School of Design merged with the Pratt Institute to form the Pratt-Phoenix School of Design

Overview
Phoenix Art Institute taught traditional fine art, illustration, and commercial art. Phoenix was the president and an instructor. Booth taught at the school for 21 years and remained affiliated with the organization until his death in 1948. At some point he was vice-president and a trustee of the organization. Other teachers were Norman Rockwell, Walter Beach Humphrey, and Thomas Fogarty.

Alumni

Walt Kelly (cartoonist) <Michael Barrier (November 27, 2014). Funnybooks: The Improbable Glories of the Best American Comic Books. Univ of California Press. pp. 36–37. .>
 Warren King (cartoonist)
 Bob Montana
 John Cullen Murphy
 Walter Reed
 Bettina Steinke
 Kiyoshi Takahashi
 Frank Wright, Jr.

Mergers

In 1944, The Phoenix Art Institute merged with the New York School of Applied Design for Women, which reincorporated as the co-educational New York Phoenix School of Design. In 1974, the New York Phoenix School of Design merged with the Pratt Institute to form the Pratt-Phoenix School of Design.

References

Art schools in New York City
Design schools in the United States
1925 establishments in New York City
Educational institutions established in 1925